In naval architecture, a poop deck is a deck that forms the roof of a cabin built in the rear, or  "aft", part of the superstructure of a ship.

The name originates from the French word for stern, la poupe, from Latin puppis. Thus the poop deck is technically a stern deck, which in sailing ships was usually elevated as the roof of the stern or "after" cabin, also known as the "poop cabin". On sailing ships, the helmsman would steer the craft from the quarterdeck, immediately in front of the poop deck.  At the stern, the poop deck provides an elevated position ideal for observation.

On modern, motorized warships, the ship functions which were once carried out on the poop deck have been moved to the bridge, usually located in a superstructure.

See also
Common names for decks
Taffrail, the handrail around the poop deck
Quarter gallery, a projecting area at the stern
Puppis

References

Sailing ship components
Shipbuilding
Nautical terminology